Harborne is an area southwest from Birmingham city centre, England.

Harborne or Harbourne may also refer to:

Places near Harborne
 Harborne (ward)
 Harborne Railway
 Harborne railway station
 Harborne Reserve

Other uses
 Harbourne Blue, a goat's cheese produced in Devon
 Harbourne River, a river in Devon, England

People with the surname Harborne
 Jeffrey Harborne (1928–2002), British botany professor
 William Harborne (c. 1542–1617), English businessman and ambassador to the Ottoman Empire